Takakia lepidozioides is a species of moss in the Takakiaceae family, one of two species of Takakia. It is characterized by its tiny bifid leaves in which each segment is only a few cells wide, conspicuous rhizomous shoots, and long leafless stolon shoots which facilitate the colonization of bare areas. A very unusual feature is the lack of male plants within the species, which are thought to have become extinct during an ice age.

References

External links
Flora of North America
Botany Photo of the Day

Takakiopsida